Garth "GGGarth" Richardson is a Canadian record producer and music engineer. He is the son of music producer Jack Richardson (Alice Cooper, The Guess Who, Badfinger, Poco), a pioneer of the music recording industry in the 1960s and 1970s. Garth Richardson has done music engineering work for the likes of Red Hot Chili Peppers, Nickelback,  and Mötley Crüe, and produced for Kittie, Biffy Clyro, Rage Against the Machine, Mudvayne, Melvins, Shihad, Kensington, and many others. He cofounded the Nimbus School of Recording Arts in Vancouver, British Columbia together with Bob Ezrin and Kevin Williams. The school was named after Richardson's father's production company, Nimbus 9, and offers courses in production, recording, and audio. Richardson has the nickname 'GGGarth' due to his mild stutter.

Partial list of production credits

 Rage Against the Machine – Rage Against the Machine (1992)
 Melvins – Houdini (1993)
 L7 – Hungry for Stink (1994)
 Surgery – Shimmer (1994)
 Testament – Low (1994)
 Ugly Kid Joe – Menace to Sobriety (1995)
 Voodoo Glow Skulls – Firme (1995)
 The Jesus Lizard – Shot (1996)
 Skunk Anansie – Stoosh (1996)
 Kerbdog – On the Turn (1997)
 Sick of It All – Built to Last (1997)
 The Urge – Master of Styles (1998)
 Shihad – The General Electric (1999), Love Is the New Hate (2005)
 The O.C. Supertones – Chase the Sun (1999)
 Kittie – Spit (2000), Oracle (2001)
 Project 86 – Drawing Black Lines (2000), ...And the Rest Will Follow (2005)
 Mudvayne – L.D. 50 (2000)
 Spineshank – The Height of Callousness (2000), Self-Destructive Pattern (2003)
 40 Below Summer – Invitation to the Dance (2001)
 Puya – Union (2001)
 Chevelle – Wonder What's Next (2002)
 Downthesun – Downthesun (2002)
 Trapt – Trapt (2002), Only Through the Pain (2008)
 Beloved – Failure On (2003)
 Spoken – A Moment of Imperfect Clarity (2003)
 From Autumn to Ashes – The Fiction We Live (2003), Abandon Your Friends (2005)
 Atreyu – The Curse (2004)
 Rise Against – Siren Song of the Counter Culture (2004)
 Bloodsimple – A Cruel World (2005)
 Still Remains – Of Love and Lunacy (2005)
 Haste the Day – When Everything Falls (2005), Pressure the Hinges (2007)
 Hedley – Hedley (2005)
 GrimSkunk – Fires Under the Road (2006)
 It Dies Today – Sirens (2006)
 Ten Second Epic – Count Yourself In (2006), Hometown (2009)
 Life in Your Way – Waking Giants (2007)
 Biffy Clyro – Puzzle (2007), Only Revolutions (2009), Opposites (2013)
 Blessed by a Broken Heart – Pedal to the Metal (2008)
 Dead and Divine – The Machines We Are (2009)
 Gallows – Grey Britain (2009)
 Japanese Voyeurs – Yolk (2011)
 You Me at Six – Sinners Never Sleep (2011)
 All the Young – Welcome Home (2012)
 The Washboard Union – The Washboard Union (2012)
 Head of the Herd – By This Time Tomorrow (2013)
 The ReAktion – Selknam (2015)
 The Empty Page – Unfolding (2016)
 Big Wreck – Grace Street (2017)
 Danko Jones – A Rock Supreme (2019)
 Kensington - Time (2019)

Awards and nominations
In 2005, Richardson received his third Juno Award nomination in the Jack Richardson Producer of the Year category, an award named in honour of his father.

References

External links
 
 Gggarth on Discogs
 Nimbus School of Recording Arts official website

Living people
1960 births
Canadian record producers
Canadian audio engineers
Jack Richardson Producer of the Year Award winners